These are the Canadian number-one country songs of 1964, per the RPM Country Tracks chart.

See also
1964 in Canadian music

References

External links
 Read about RPM Magazine at the AV Trust
 Search RPM charts here at Library and Archives Canada

Canada Country
1964
1964 in Canadian music